Thrombus is a genus of sea sponge belonging to the family Thrombidae.

Species
 Thrombus abyssi (Carter, 1873)
 Thrombus challengeri Sollas, 1886
 Thrombus jancai Lehnert, 1998
 Thrombus ornatus Sollas, 1888

References 

Tetractinellida